L. Gundappa M.A. (1903-1986) was professor of Kannada literature in Bangalore University and a pioneer in the Kannada literature revival, inspired by his mentor, B. M. Srikantaiah. He was an accomplished poet and writer who introduced Kannada readers to world literature by translating classics from ancient Kannada and Classic Tamil to modern Kannada. He translated short stories of Tolstoy from English, and won a gold medal for the translation of a poem by Matthew Arnold (titled Sohrab and Rustum) to Kannada. He worked on the first dictionary from English to Kannada. He wrote a definitive book on the art of translation called Kannadi Seyve (mirroring). He was honored by both the Kannada and Tamil people for his service to literature.

Early education
Gundappa was born on 8 January 1903 to Chennamma and Lingannayya, in the small south Indian village Matighatta. His early childhood education was in historical Belur, Karnataka where he assimilated a meticulous and in-depth education in Sanskrit and the Vedas. He had mastered Sanskrit by the time he completed his middle school education. Seeking a proper high school education, Gundappa moved to Chikmagalur. There, the young Gundappa got noticed for his original devotional poems in Sanskrit that he composed and presented at a welcoming ceremony for Abhinava Vidya Theertha Swami, the religious leader (pontiff) of the Sringeri Sharada Peetham. The Swami declared that a small monthly stipend would be awarded to support Gundappa's college education.

The Mysore Maharaja's College where Gundappa studied was a fertile ground of intellectuals working for India's rising from oppression by the British Raj. Movements were being born at the universities urging Indians to rediscover their own heritage hereto neglected under foreign rule. Several of the leaders were literary giants of the day who were faculty members at the university including B.M.Sri (Gundappa's mentor), T.S. Venkataiah, and A.R. Krishnashastry. Gundappa was drawn to this cause of rediscovering the pride in Indian culture and literature. Urged by his mentor to learn another Indian language than his mother tongue Kannada, Gundappa chose Tamil as a part of the curriculum for a master's degree in languages. He set out to serve the Kannada people by re-introducing them to their own glorious heritage by writing works of literature from Sanskrit, Tamil, and English (selecting world literature translated to English by others) by way of meticulous translations to Kannada that were to be his life's work.

Family life
Gundappa was married to Smt. Sharada of Akki Hebbal and had 7 children, of whom Dr. L.G. Sumitra made original contributions to Kannada Folklore, folk Music, and broadcasting (winning HOSO Bunka, an international Award for broadcasting). Vimala Rajagopal applied Kannada folk music to the field of music therapy and taught Kannada as a foreign language in the US. Kamala Balu was a national newscaster in Kannada from New Delhi. Amritheshwar (deceased) is an author of children's books, Veena Rao is a painter and nutritionist, Dr. Vasanthi Culleton, a researcher and scientific writer and L. G. Jyothishwara, a producer of educational videos and writer of travel books. Additionally, Sumitra, Vimala and Kamala were singers widely known already in their teens as L.G. sisters, who popularized Kannada folk songs and Bhava Geethegalu (light songs) by contemporary poets such as Pu Ti Narasimhachar and Bendre.

Awards
B.M. Sri Memorial Gold medal (1930)
Devaraja Bahaddur Award (1935)
Tamil Writer's Association award (1956)
Kannada Sahitya Academy Award (1975)

Original works of L. Gundappa
(Kannada title followed by a translation of the meaning)

Chataki mattu Itara Kavanagalu - Chataki and other poems – including the children's favorite "Appana jebina duddugalella"
Kannadi Seve’ – premier book on the art of translation
Tamilu purathana Kathegalu matthu Hariharan Ragale– the ancient stories of Tamil and the Ragale by Harihara
Sarvagna and Thiruvalluvar (an essay)
Kannad Sahitya Chitragalu – Volumes I, II and III (Collections of Essays)
Natygarthiyaru – The Dancers – Madhavi is Shilappadigaram (Essay)
Yuddha Siddahte mattu vyuha rachane – Preparation for war (Essay)
Kavi Vani – The Poet's Message
Mukunda Mala (interconversions of prose and poetry)
Avvayyar and other essays
Bhasa's Karna – an essay on the character "Karna" by the poet Bhasa
Avvayyar Krutigalu - Avvayyar's works
Pampa Parichaya – introduction to Pampa (an ancient Kannada writer)
Pampana Hita Vachanagalu – The Teachings of Pampa
Kamba Ramayana – The Ramayana by Kamba (Essay)
Arundhati (An old song)
Bahubali Chritram – the History of Bahubali (a Jain king and later, a monk)
Books for which L. Gundappa was Editor/publisher
Adipuraana Sangraha (Editor) – A book on the history of Jainism and the essence of Jain Religious teaching
Naada Padagalu (Editor) – songs collected by Matighatta Krishnamurthi
Nala Charitre – Story of Nala
Sri Bhagavaccharitre
Sri Jyothirlinga Swamigala Jeevana Charitre – The Biography of Sri. Jyothirlinga swami
Srimadabhinava Vidyathirtha Vijayam

References

Sources
Articles in Kannada (a South Indian language) newspapers: :Article by Prof. G. Venkatasubbiah in "Kannada Prabha" 5 January 2004; and various authors in Prajavani 4 January 2004 and Vijaya Karnataka Sunday 11 January 2004. These articles were written in Kannada as part of centennial celebrations for L. Gundappa.

Academic staff of Bangalore University
1903 births
1986 deaths
Tamil–Kannada translators
Translators of the Tirukkural into Kannada
20th-century translators
Tirukkural translators